Derzhava was a Ukrainian political party registered in late 1999 that formed a coalition with the Progressive Socialist Party of Ukraine after the Orange Revolution. Its former name was "Rus United".

It participated in the 2006 elections to the Verkhovna Rada as part of the electoral bloc "State – Labor Union" which obtained 0.14% of the votes. In 2006, it was led by Hennadiy Vasilyev. It did not participate in the 2002 or 2007 elections.

Derzhava was one of several political parties suspended by the National Security and Defense Council of Ukraine during the 2022 Russian invasion of Ukraine, along with Left Opposition, Nashi, Opposition Bloc, Opposition Platform — For Life, Party of Shariy, Progressive Socialist Party of Ukraine, Socialist Party of Ukraine, Union of Leftists, and the Volodymyr Saldo Bloc.

On 14 June 2022 the Eighth Administrative Court of Appeal banned the party.

References

1999 establishments in Ukraine
2022 disestablishments in Ukraine
Banned political parties in Ukraine
Banned socialist parties
Defunct socialist parties in Ukraine
Political parties disestablished in 2022
Political parties established in 1999
Russian political parties in Ukraine